Patrick Murphy (born 7 November 1933) is a former Canadian cyclist. He competed in the individual and team road race events at the 1956 Summer Olympics.

References

External links
 

1933 births
Living people
Canadian male cyclists
Olympic cyclists of Canada
Cyclists from Ontario
Cyclists at the 1956 Summer Olympics
Cyclists at the 1958 British Empire and Commonwealth Games
Commonwealth Games competitors for Canada